Margaret M. Burnett (born 1949) is a computer scientist specializing in work at the intersection of human computer interaction and software engineering, and known for her pioneering work in visual programming languages, end-user software engineering, and gender-inclusive software. She is a Distinguished Professor of Computer Science at Oregon State University,, a member of the CHI Academy, and a Fellow of the Association for Computing Machinery.

Education and career
Burnett was born in 1949, and is originally from Springfield, Illinois.
She studied at Miami University of Ohio from 1967 to 1970, brought there in part by their newly established program in computer science but eventually majoring in mathematics. After graduating, she became a software engineer for Procter & Gamble, the first women hired in a management position at their Ivorydale factory and research center in Cincinnati, Ohio.
She left soon after, following her husband to Santa Fe, New Mexico, where she started her own business, and then to Lawrence, Kansas.

In Kansas, she became a student again at the University of Kansas (KU). She earned a master's degree there in 1981, began working as an independent consultant, then started a small consulting business with William Bulgren, a professor at KU, and eventually returned to KU for a Ph.D. in 1987. Her dissertation, Abstraction in the Demand-Driven, Temporal-Assignment, Visual Language Model, concerned visual programming languages and was supervised by Allen L. Ambler.

On completing her doctorate, she became a Computer Science faculty member at Michigan Technological University. In 1993, she moved to Oregon State University's Computer Science Department.  She and Cherri M. Pancake (hired the same year), were the first two women to be hired as tenure-track Computer Science faculty at Oregon State.

Activism
As a graduate student at the University of Kansas, Burnett founded a group for the professional women of Lawrence, Kansas to network for each other, the Lawrence Women's Network, which is still active.

In the early 2000s she began developing methods for software engineers to check how gender-inclusive their software is, and she has given keynote addresses in software engineering concerning issues of gender-inclusivity for software and software engineers.

Recognition
In 2016, Burnett became a Distinguished Professor at Oregon State University, and was named to the CHI Academy.
She was elected as a Fellow of the Association for Computing Machinery in 2017 "for contributions to end-user software engineering, understanding gender biases in software, and broadening participation in computing".

References

External links
Home page

1949 births
Living people
People from Springfield, Illinois
American computer scientists
American women computer scientists
Miami University alumni
University of Kansas alumni
Michigan Technological University faculty
Oregon State University faculty
Fellows of the Association for Computing Machinery
Engineers from Illinois
American women academics
21st-century American women